The 20th Kansas Militia Infantry was an infantry regiment that served in the Union Army during the American Civil War.

Service
The 20th Kansas Militia Infantry was called into service on October 9, 1864. It was disbanded on October 29, 1864.

Detailed service
The unit was called into service to defend Kansas against Price's Raid. The regiment saw action at Byram's Ford, Big Blue, October 22. Westport October 23.

Commander
 Colonel John Barker Hubbell

See also

 List of Kansas Civil War Units
 Kansas in the Civil War

References
 Dyer, Frederick H. A Compendium of the War of the Rebellion (Des Moines, IA: Dyer Pub. Co.), 1908.
Attribution
 

Military units and formations established in 1864
Military units and formations disestablished in 1864
Units and formations of the Union Army from Kansas
1864 establishments in Kansas